Paracossus hainanicus is a moth in the family Cossidae. It was described by Yakovlev in 2009. It is found in China (Hainan).

References

Natural History Museum Lepidoptera generic names catalog

Cossinae
Moths described in 2009